VA Tech is an informally used unofficial name for Virginia Tech (Virginia Polytechnic Institute and State University), in Blacksburg, Virginia.

VA Tech may also refer to:

 VA Tech Hydro, a subsidiary of the Austrian industrial processesing group Andritz AG
 VA Tech Wabag, a company with headquarters in Austria and India
 VA Technologie, an Austrian company taken over by Siemens AG in 2005

See also
Virginia Tech shooting, the shooting on the Virginia Tech campus on April 16, 2007